Arthur Alexander Griffiths (23 April 1908 – 1995) was a Welsh footballer who played in the Football League for Newport County, Rochdale, Stoke City and Torquay United.

Career
Griffiths was born in Tonypandy had a nomadic career which started with Barry. He then joined Football League Third Division South side Torquay United and then Newport County before returning to Barry. After a spell at Cheltenham Town he returned to Barry again and then went to Northern Ireland to play for Newry Town and Glentoran. He returned to England to play for Rochdale and after scoring five goals in 14 matches he attracted the attention of First Division Stoke City but he played just four matches for Stoke before ending his career.

Career statistics
Source:

References

Welsh footballers
Stoke City F.C. players
Cheltenham Town F.C. players
Torquay United F.C. players
Rochdale A.F.C. players
Newport County A.F.C. players
English Football League players
1908 births
1995 deaths
Association football outside forwards
Glentoran F.C. players
Barry Town United F.C. players